Tarico Heights is an unincorporated community on West Virginia Route 51 along Opequon Creek in Berkeley County, West Virginia, United States.

Unincorporated communities in Berkeley County, West Virginia
Unincorporated communities in West Virginia